Saif Ali Khan (born Sajid Ali Khan Pataudi; 16 August 1970) is an Indian actor and film producer who works in Hindi films. Part of the Pataudi family, he is the son of actress Sharmila Tagore and cricketer Mansoor Ali Khan Pataudi.

Khan made his acting debut in Parampara (1993). He failed to earn hits with solo lead films in the 90s and had rare successes only in the multi-starrers Yeh Dillagi (1994), Main Khiladi Tu Anari (1994), Kachche Dhaage (1999) and Hum Saath-Saath Hain (1999). It was the 2000s when Khan proved his potential as an established actor starting with the sleeper hit Kya Kehna (2000) and won several accolades for the ensemble romantic comedy-dramas Dil Chahta Hai (2001) and Kal Ho Naa Ho (2003). Further critical and commercial success came with Hum Tum (2004), Parineeta (2005), Salaam Namaste (2005) and Ta Ra Rum Pum (2007).

Khan also earned critical acclaim for playing a manipulative businessman in Ek Hasina Thi (2004), an apprentice in the English film Being Cyrus (2006) and an antagonist in Omkara (2006). His biggest hits as lead include Race (2008), Love Aaj Kal (2009), Cocktail (2012) and Race 2 (2013). After another string of under-performing ventures, Khan was appreciated for headlining Netflix's first original Indian series Sacred Games (2018) and the main antagonist in the historical drama Tanhaji (2020), which ranks as his highest grossing release.

Khan has won several accolades, including a National Film Award and seven Filmfare Awards, and received the Padma Shri, the fourth highest Indian civilian award in 2010. He has been noted for his performances in a range of film genres—from crime dramas to action thrillers and comic romances. In addition to film acting, Khan is a frequent television presenter, stage show performer, and the owner of the production companies Illuminati Films and Black Knight Films.

Early life and family 

Khan was born on 16 August 1970 in New Delhi, India to Mansoor Ali Khan Pataudi, a former captain of the Indian national cricket team, and his wife Sharmila Tagore, a film actress. Khan's father, who was the son of the last ruling Nawab of the princely state of Pataudi during the British Raj, received a privy purse from the Government of India under terms worked out in the Political integration of India and was allowed to use the title Nawab of Pataudi until 1971 when the title was abolished. Following Mansur Ali Khan's death in 2011, a symbolic pagri ceremony was held in the village of Pataudi, Haryana to "crown" Khan as the "tenth Nawab of Pataudi," which Khan attended to please the sentiments of the villagers, who wanted him to continue a family tradition. Khan has two younger sisters, jewelry designer Saba Ali Khan and actress Soha Ali Khan, and is the paternal grandson of Iftikhar Ali Khan Pataudi who played for the Indian cricket team in England in 1946, and Sajida Sultan, the Nawab Begum of Bhopal. Hamidullah Khan, the last ruling Nawab of Bhopal was his great-grandfather, and the cricketer Saad Bin Jung is his first cousin.

Speaking about his childhood, Khan said that he was exposed to a "life beyond movies", and his mother described him as someone who was "not an easy child [...] He was impulsive [and] spontaneous." Saif grew up a Muslim. As a child, he recalls fond memories of watching his father playing cricket in the garden, and has emphasised his father's education and background as having a lasting impression on how family life was conducted. Khan studied at The Lawrence School, Sanawar in Himachal Pradesh and was later sent to Lockers Park School in Hertfordshire at the age of nine. He next enrolled at Winchester College and explained that "I did not take advantage of my tenure [there]. My classmates went on to Oxford and Cambridge, but I was not academically inclined. When I applied myself, which was not often, I stood first. I should have studied harder."

After graduating from the boarding school, Khan returned to India and worked for an advertising firm in Delhi for two months. He later appeared in the television commercial for Gwalior Suiting on the insistence of a family friend, and was subsequently cast by director Anand Mahindroo. The project eventually got cancelled but Khan relocated to Mumbai to pursue a career in film; he recalls, "Finally I had some direction and focus. I remember [...] feeling so excited that I could go to Mumbai, stay in my own place and enjoy the adventure of starting my own career."

Personal life and career

First marriage, early roles and career struggles (1991–2000) 
In 1991, Khan was cast as the male lead in Rahul Rawail's romantic drama Bekhudi (1992) alongside debutante Kajol, but after completing the first shooting schedule of the film, he was considered to be unprofessional by Rawail and was replaced by Kamal Sadanah. While filming Bekhudi, Khan met actress Amrita Singh whom he married in October 1991. Singh gave birth to their daughter, Sara Ali Khan (b.1995) and a son (b. 2001). The couple separated in 2004.

In 1993, Khan made his acting debut with Yash Chopra’s Parampara. The film, which tells the story of two estranged brothers (played by Aamir Khan and Khan), failed to find a wide audience. In 1993, he appeared opposite Mamta Kulkarni and Shilpa Shirodkar in the box office flops Aashiq Awara and Pehchaan. For his performance in the former, Khan earned the Filmfare Award for Best Male Debut at the 39th Filmfare Awards.

Following an appearance in the moderately successful Imtihaan (1994) with Sunny Deol , Khan paired up with Akshay Kumar for next two releases— Yash Raj Films' hit romantic commedy-drama Yeh Dillagi and the action film Main Khiladi Tu Anari. The former was an unofficial remake of the 1954 Hollywood film Sabrina, and depicted a love triangle between a chauffeur's daughter (played by Kajol) and the two sons of her father's employers (played by Kumar and Khan). Main Khiladi Tu Anari (the second film in the Khiladi series) featured Khan as an aspiring actor, and emerged as the fifth highest-grossing film of the year. Bollywood Hungama reported that the success of both films proved a breakthrough for Khan, and his performance in Main Khiladi Tu Anari fetched him his first nomination for the Best Supporting Actor at the Filmfare Awards. The Indian Express singled out his performances in both films, noting his comic timing in the latter as keeping the audience "in splits whenever he appears on screen". Khan’s next two releases of the year, the dramas Yaar Gaddar and Aao Pyaar Karen, were unsuccessful. His career observed a steady decline through the 1990s; all nine films he starredSurakshaa (1995), Ek Tha Raja (1996), Bambai Ka Babu (1996), Tu Chor Main Sipahi (1996), Dil Tera Diwana (1996), Hameshaa (1997), Udaan (1997), Keemat: They Are Back (1998) and Humse Badhkar Kaun (1998)were commercially unsuccessful. During this time, the critics perceived his career to be over.

After four consecutive years of poorly-received films, Khan's career prospects began to improve in 1999; he appeared in four films: Yeh Hai Mumbai Meri Jaan, Kachche Dhaage, Aarzoo and Hum Saath-Saath Hain. The romantic comedy Yeh Hai Mumbai Meri Jaan (alongside Twinkle Khanna) and the romance Aarzoo (alongside Madhuri Dixit and Akshay Kumar) earned little at the box office, but the action-thriller Kachche Dhaage (a story about two estranged brothers becoming the target of a terrorist conspiracy) was Khan's first commercial success since Main Khiladi Tu Anari. Directed by Milan Luthria, the film was generally well received but critics noted that Khan was overshadowed by co-actor Ajay Devgn. The film, however, earned Khan his second Best Supporting Actor nomination at Filmfare. Khan described his final release of the year, the Sooraj Barjatya-directed family drama Hum Saath-Saath Hain, as a "morale-booster". The film featured an ensemble cast (Mohnish Behl, Tabu, Salman Khan, Sonali Bendre and Karisma Kapoor) and emerged as the highest-grossing film of the year, earning over  worldwide. During the filming of Hum Saath-Saath Hain, Khan was charged with poaching two blackbucks in Kankani along with co-stars Salman, Tabu, Bendre and Neelam Kothari. That year, he also appeared briefly in the David Dhawan-directed comedy Biwi No.1, a box office hit.

The drama Kya Kehna by director Kundan Shah was Khan's only release of 2000, in which he played the casanova Rahul Modi. Co-starring alongside Preity Zinta and Chandrachur Singh, Khan compared the portrayal of his character with his own evolving maturity as a father. The film addressed themes of single parenthood and teenage pregnancy and emerged a sleeper hit. The Indian Express believed that Khan "looks debauched enough to be the rogue he plays. He is the only dark aspect in a film that is sunny and bright even at its most tragic."

Rise to prominence (2001–2004) 
In 2001, Khan appeared in Eeshwar Nivas' box office flop Love Ke Liye Kuch Bhi Karega, (a film loosely inspired by the 1996 black comedy Fargo) following which he featured alongside Aamir Khan and Akshaye Khanna in Farhan Akhtar's coming-of-age comedy drama Dil Chahta Hai. Depicting the contemporary routine life of Indian affluent youth, it is set in modern-day urban Mumbai and focuses on a major period of transition in the lives of three young friends. Khan played Sameer Mulchandani, a "hopeless romantic", and was particularly drawn to the qualities of his character. Dil Chahta Hai was highly popular with critics and won the National Film Award for Best Feature Film in Hindi; it performed well in the big cities, but failed in the rural areas, which was attributed by critics to the urban-oriented lifestyle it presented. The feature marked a significant turning point in Khan's career, earning him the Filmfare Award for Best Performance in a Comic Role and awards for Best Supporting Actor at the Screen, Zee Cine and International Indian Academy (IIFA) ceremonies. Rediff.com wrote that Khan was able to rise above his "under-sketched character", and the critic Taran Adarsh described him as "excellent", arguing that it was his "career-best performance".

Following an appearance in two poorly-received films: Rehnaa Hai Terre Dil Mein (2001) and Na Tum Jaano Na Hum (2002), Khan played a photographer in the second chapter ("No Smoking") of Prawaal Raman's anthology ensemble thriller Darna Mana Hai (2003). The film failed to find a wide audience and earned little at the box office.

Bollywood Hungama described his next film, the Nikhil Advani-directed romantic comedy-drama Kal Ho Naa Ho (2003), as a "landmark" in his career. Set in New York City, it was written by Karan Johar and co-starred Jaya Bachchan, Shah Rukh Khan and Preity Zinta. It also did well internationally and became the highest-grossing film of the year overseas. Khan was cast in the role of Rohit Patela carefree young man who falls in love with Zinta's characterafter Advani had seen his performance in Dil Chahta Hai. Writing for Outlook, Komal Nahta described Khan as a "natural" and "extremely endearing", and Ram Kamal Mukherjee from Stardust opined that he was successful in displaying "a gamut of emotions." Khan garnered several awards for his performance, including his first Filmfare Award for Best Supporting Actor, and expressed gratitude to Shah Rukh for teaching "me so muchmainly the responsibility of the main lead". He explained that the film's success led to Yash Raj Films casting him in the 2004 romantic comedy Hum Tum. At the end of the year, he appeared briefly as Cpt. Anuj Nayyar in J. P. Dutta's ensemble box office flop LOC Kargil.

In an attempt to avoid typecasting and broaden his range as an actor, Khan starred as Karan Singh Rathod in the thriller Ek Hasina Thi (2004), a character he described as "a Charles Sobhraj-meets-James Bond kind of a guy". The film (which marked the debut of Sriram Raghavan) tells the story of a young woman (played by Urmila Matondkar) who meets with Khan's character, and is subsequently arrested for having links with the underworld. When Khan was initially offered the project, he was unable to do it due to his busy schedule. However, he agreed when Raghavan approached him for the second time, and in preparation for the role, exercised extensively for six months to achieve the physical requirements of his character. Upon release, the film was positively received by critics, with Khan's performing earning praise. Film critic Anupama Chopra wrote that Khan gave "an accomplished performance", whilst The Deccan Herald opined that he was successful in "break[ing] out of the cool dude stereotype" and "hold[ing] his own in a movie that is completely Matondkar's." For his performance, Khan received nominations at the Screen, Zee Cine and IIFA ceremonies.

For his next release, Khan featured in a starring role opposite Rani Mukerji in Kunal Kohli's Hum Tum, a romantic comedy about two headstrong individuals who meet at different stages of their lives. He was cast in the role of Karan Kapoor (a young cartoonist and womanizer) after Aamir Khan was unable to do the film; Kohli said, "I realised that the role needed a younger man [...] someone who could present a more youthful picture. Saif has this unique quality, he can play a 21-year old as well as a 29-year old and was ideal for [the film]." Rediff.com wrote about his performance: "Saif reprises his urbane self from Dil Chahta Hai and Kal Ho Naa Ho, peppering it with occasional fits of introspection and angst, and marking himself as an actor whose time has come." He won the Filmfare Award for Best Performance in a Comic Role, in addition to his first nomination for the Filmfare Award for Best Actor, and was conferred the National Film Award for Best Actor at the 52nd National Film Awards amid much controversy. It marked the beginning of his work with Yash Raj Films, one of the largest production houses in Bollywood. In 2004, Khan began dating model Rosa Catalano whom he separated with three years later.

Established actor and film production (2005–2010) 
In 2005, Rediff.com published that Khan had established himself as a leading actor of Hindi cinema with starring roles in the romantic drama Parineeta and the comedy-drama Salaam Namaste. An adaptation of Sarat Chandra Chattopadhyay's 1914 Bengali novella by the same name, Parineeta was directed by Pradeep Sarkar, and narrated the love story of an idealist (Lalita, played by Vidya Balan) and a musician (Shekhar, played by Khan), the son of a capitalist businessman. Although the film's producer, Vidhu Vinod Chopra, considered Khan to be too inexperienced for the part, he was persuaded by Sarkar who felt that Khan was perfect for the role. The film garnered critical acclaim upon release and Khan's portrayal earned him his second nomination for the Filmfare Award for Best Actor. Derek Elley from Variety wrote, "Khan, who has gradually been developing away from light comedy, again shows smarts as a substantial actor." The film tells the story of a contemporary cohabiting Indian couple (Khan and Preity Zinta) and their subsequent struggle with an unexpected pregnancy. Khan played the role of Nikhil Arora, a single modern young man who leaves India to make his own life in Melbourne. The critic Taran Adarsh praised Khan for delivering his third successive performance and Khalid Mohamed noted that he "rescues several untidily written scenes with his neat wit and that flustered [...] facial expression."

He next played the protagonist in the English language art film, Being Cyrus (2006), co-starring alongside Naseeruddin Shah and Dimple Kapadia. Directed by debutant Homi Adajania, the psychological drama revolves around a dysfunctional Parsi family with who Khan's character moves into. The film received predominantly positive reviews, and Khan was particularly praised. Later in the year, he portrayed the character of Iago in Omkara, the Indian adaptation of William Shakespeare's Othello. Directed by Vishal Bhardwaj, the film is a tragedy of sexual jealousy set against the backdrop of the political system in Uttar Pradesh. The film premiered at the 2006 Cannes Film Festival and was also selected for screening at the Cairo International Film Festival. Omkara was received positively by critics, and Khan went on to receive widespread critical acclaim and accolades, earning the awards for Best Performance in a Negative Role at the Filmfare, Screen, Zee Cine and IIFA ceremonies; his performance was later included in the 2010 issue of the "Top 80 Iconic Performances" by Filmfare. Variety described it as a "powerhouse performance" and wrote that "[i]t is Khan's film through and through, in a performance of rugged, contained malevolence which trades on his previous screen persona as a likable best friend as well as his stint as the manipulative outsider in Being Cyrus. It is smart casting, superbly realized."

By 2007, Khan was keen on branching out into film production to "explore various genres of commercial and intellectually stimulating cinema". The critical success of Being Cyrus led him to create Illuminati Films and partner up with producer Dinesh Vijan, someone whom he shared a "like-minded perspective and ideology [...] with regard to cinema". Khan next reunited with producer Vidhu Vinod Chopra in the epic drama Eklavya: The Royal Guard (2007), alongside Amitabh Bachchan, Boman Irani, Sharmila Tagore and Vidya Balan. Set in the state of Rajasthan during the early years of Indian independence, the movie revolves around a jealous and ungrateful ruler and his ailing wife. Although the film did not succeed at the box office, it was chosen as India's official entry to the Oscars. BBC Online described the film as a "cinematic experience" and praised Khan's growth as an actor, particular noting his scene with Bachchan's character. Following an appearance in the poorly-received action-comedy Nehlle Pe Dehlla (a production that had been delayed since 2001), Khan featured opposite Rani Mukerji in the family drama Ta Ra Rum Pum (2007). Writing for Hindustan Times, Khalid Mohamed praised Khan for displaying a new maturity, but Rajeev Masand thought that neither he nor Mukerji "are able to make much of an impression because their characters are so unidimensional and boring."

Khan received further success in 2008, starring in the Abbas–Mustan thriller Race with an ensemble cast including Anil Kapoor, Akshaye Khanna, Bipasha Basu, Katrina Kaif and Sameera Reddy. The feature was loosely adapted from the 1998 American film Goodbye Lover, and became one of the biggest box office hits, earning  worldwide. CNN-IBN's Rajeev Masand found Khan to be a standout among the ensemble, adding that he has "the least dialogue, but the one who makes the best impression". This was followed by three projects produced by Yash Raj Films: the action-thriller Tashan, the fantasy comedy-drama Thoda Pyaar Thoda Magic, and the animated film Roadside Romeo, all of which were unsuccessful.

In 2009, Khan appeared in the romantic drama Sanam Teri Kasam, a production that had been delayed since 2000. The film garnered negative reviews and poor box office returns. Khan's role was small, and not well received. He next starred in his company's first project: Love Aaj Kal (2009), a romantic comedy-drama from the writer-director Imtiaz Ali. Featured opposite Deepika Padukone, the film documented the changing value of relationships among the youth, and Khan played dual rolesthe younger part of Rishi Kapoor's character (Veer Singh) and Jai Vardhan Singh, an ambitious architect. Love Aaj Kal received highly positive reviews by critics and became one of the highest-grossing films of the year, earning over  worldwide. Gaurav Malani of The Economic Times described his performance as "refreshing natural" and "outstanding". At the 55th Filmfare Awards, Love Aaj Kal was nominated for Best Film and Khan received his fourth nomination for Best Actor.

He then starred in the terrorism thriller Kurbaan, alongside Kareena Kapoor, Vivek Oberoi and Dia Mirza. Produced by Dharma Productions, the film marked the directorial debut of Rensil D'Silva and featured Khan in the role of a terrorist. Upon release, Kurbaan was received favourably by critics and Khan's performance was critically acclaimed. A review in The Telegraph praised his "easy transition from a charming lover to a heartless man on a deadly mission."

Career fluctuations and second marriage (2011–2015) 
In 2011, he appeared in Prakash Jha's multi-starrer drama Aarakshan. Set in the city of Bhopal, Madhya Pradesh, the film deals with the policy of caste-based reservations in government jobs and educational institutions. Khan portrayed the character of Deepak Kumar, a rebellious student who joins the mafia. To prepare for the role, Khan was required to take acting workshops along with the rest of the cast. Prior to its release, the film was banned from releasing in select cities across India due to its controversial subject. While the film received a mixed critical reaction, his performance was generally well received. The following year, Khan produced both of his films. For his first release, he collaborated once again with director Sriram Raghavan, as the protagonist in the action thriller Agent Vinod.

In his following release, Homi Adajania's romantic comedy-drama Cocktail, he featured as the software engineer Gautam Kapoor. Set in London, the film follows the story of Khan's character and his relationship with two temperamentally different womenan impulsive party girl (Veronica, played by Padukone) and a submissive girl next door (Meera, played by Diana Penty). Khan described the project as "a love story with a modern sensibility and treatment", and agreed to produce and feature in the film after his role was declined by Imran Khan. Critics were divided in their opinion of the film, but it emerged a financial success grossing over  worldwide. Gaurav Malani of The Times of India described Khan's performance as "effortless" and noted that he was in his "comfort zone". On 16 October 2012, Khan married actress Kareena Kapoor (after a five-year courtship) in a private ceremony in Bandra, Mumbai, and a reception was later held at The Taj Mahal Palace Hotel and the Lutyens Bungalow Zone in Mumbai and Delhi respectively. The couple have two sons born in 2016 and 2021 respectively.

The following year, Khan collaborated with Padukone for the fourth time (alongside Anil Kapoor, John Abraham, Jacqueline Fernandez and Ameesha Patel) in Abbas–Mustan's Race 2 (2013), an ensemble action thriller that served as a sequel to Race (2008). He was next cast as Boris, a "Russian mafia don", in Raj Nidimoru and Krishna D.K.'s Go Goa Gone (described as "India's first zom-com") alongside Kunal Khemu and Vir Das. Khan, who bleached his hair for the film, was particularly drawn to the project for its novel concept and its "action, comedy and violence". The critic Rajeev Masand described the film as "a winning cocktail of laugh-out-loud dialogue and well-timed performances by the three leads", and in particular noted Khan's scene with Khemu's character. His final release of the year was Bullett Raja, a crime drama directed by Tigmanshu Dhulia, and co-starring Jimmy Shergill and Sonakshi Sinha. Khan explained that he found himself challenged playing the role of Raja Mishra (a common man who turns into a gangster) but "totally relied" on Dhulia's guidance. Bullett Raja earned little at the box office and received predominantly negative reviews. Writing for Firstpost, Mihir Fadnavis found Khan to be "miscast" and described his performance as "farcial".

In an interview with The Times of India, Khan explained that he regretted starring in the 2014 Sajid Khan-directed comedy Humshakals. Co-starring alongside an ensemble cast (Ritesh Deshmukh, Ram Kapoor, Bipasha Basu, Tamannaah and Esha Gupta), Khan portrayed three different characters in an attempt to "expand my market" and step out of his comfort zone. The Hindustan Times described it as a "dim-witted comedy" and criticised Khan for being "the worst thing about [the film]." He next produced and featured in Happy Ending (2014), a romantic comedy directed by Raj Nidimoru and Krishna D.K. NDTV's Saibal Chatterjee found Khan's character of a struggling writer to be "a breezy rejig of his Hum Tum and Salaam Namaste persona of a decade ago", and noted that "the many collegiate hook-ups and break-ups he pulls off in Happy Ending do not look completely at odds with the film's purpose." Humshakals proved to be a commercial disaster and Happy Ending underperformed at the box office.

Following a brief appearance in the comedy Dolly Ki Doli (2015), he appeared alongside Kaif in Kabir Khan's counter-terrorism drama Phantom (2015). Based on the book Mumbai Avengers by Hussain Zaidi, the film is a retelling on the aftermath of the 26/11 Mumbai attacks. Khan was cast as Cpt. Daniyal Khan, a former soldier hired by the RAW agency. Phantom generated controversy when the Central Board of Film Censors deemed that the film represented Pakistan in a negative light and banned the film from releasing there. A review in The Hollywood Reporter noted that Khan was "well cast" and "believable" in his role, and Rachit Gupta of Filmfare described his performance as "a heady mix of bravado and restrained intensity [which] works in parts only."

Commercial setbacks and professional expansion (2016–present) 

During his year-long absence from the screen, Khan actively looked to play different parts, saying: "These are smarter movies, the interaction with them is deeply rewarding... I think I am finally beginning to understand my sense of style as an actor. I am developing my craft, understanding what acting and communication is." He found the role in his second collaboration with director Vishal Bhardwaj, Rangoon (2017), an epic romance set during World War II. Cast alongside Shahid Kapoor and Kangana Ranaut, Khan drew inspirations from the mannerisms of his grandfather and the character Darth Vader to portray filmmaker Rustom "Rusi" Billimoria. Rajeev Masand termed the film "overlong, indulgent to the point of exhaustion", but praised Khan for "imbu[ing] Russi with the swagger and the arrogance of an aristocrat from the forties".

He next starred as the protagonist (Roshan Kalra) in the comedy-drama Chef (2017), an official adaptation of the 2014 film of the same name, from the director Raja Krishna Menon. Khan was pleased to work with Menon and identified with the film due to its "modern, slightly unorthodox take on relationships". He borrowed several real-life experiences for his character, and in preparation, trained at the JW Marriott Hotels in Mumbai. The film received generally positive reviews with several commentators believing that it was Khan's best performance to that point. Anupama Chopra wrote: "Khan get[s] his groove back... [He] doesn’t play Roshan as a hero having a bad day. He gives us a flawed, fumbling man who is trying to repair the broken chords of his life." As with his last few releases, Rangoon and Chef earned little at the box office leading trade analysts to question his commercial appeal.

Following an appearance in the poorly-received black comedy Kaalakaandi (2018) directed by Akshat Verma, Khan appeared as Inspector Sartaj Singh in India's first Netflix original series, the crime thriller Sacred Games, based on Vikram Chandra's novel of the same name. Cast alongside Nawazuddin Siddiqui and Radhika Apte, Khan was drawn by the opportunity to be part of a "creative zone, devoid of certain pressures and constraints that one would associate with the kind of films we normally do." The show received high critical acclaim; Ankur Pathak of HuffPost called it "a sure-shot winner" and took note of Khan's "stellar performance, one that [he] chews on slowly as he disappears into the broken persona of a tormented cop." In his next release, he starred as the businessman Skakun Kothari in Gauravv Chawla's Baazaar, a drama set against the backdrop of Mumbai's stock exchange market. Khan worked with Chawla to provide off-screen inputs, and was attracted to the idea of playing the antagonist describing it as "a devious character" from the Indian epic poetry Mahabharata. The critic Udita Jhunjhunwala of Mint commended Khan for "blending the right amount of wickedness with willfulness", but Namrata Joshi found him to be "stiff [and] stern ... to communicate a rather facetious sense of menace."

Khan's desire to work in films for artistic merit irrespective of commercial appeal led him to feature as the protagonist in the action-drama Laal Kaptaan (2019). Directed by Navdeep Singh, it is set in the 18th century and tells the story of a sadhu (Khan) who goes on a killing spree with the intention of exacting revenge upon a subedar. Filming in the barren landscape of rural Rajasthan proved physically daunting for Khan, and in preparation for the role, learnt sword-fighting, horse-riding and worked with a dialect coach to speak in a Rajasthani accent. He described it as "the hardest thing I have done so far", and considered the opportunity a critical learning experience that helped him personally and professionally; it eventually failed to do well. The HuffPost praised Khan's decision to choose "morally ambiguous roles", but noted that he was "too wooden, bereft of any allure or mystery."

Khan began the new decade with a starring role in Tanhaji (2020), a historical drama directed by Om Raut. Set in the 17th century, it revolves around a Maratha warrior's (played by Devgn) attempt to recapture the Kondhana fortress from a Rajput fort keeper (Khan). He was attracted to the idea of starring in a "larger-than-life" film and was challenged by Raut's insistence on overplaying his character; he explained that the process left him "very enriched" and was pleased with the collaboration. Tanhaji was acclaimed by critics and emerged as a major commercial success grossing over  worldwide. Reviewing the film for Film Companion, Anupama Chopra found Khan's performance to be the film's prime asset and credited him for playing "the exaggerated evil with a cheeky panache." The Hindustan Times opined that Khan had delivered his best performance to date noting his "moments of mirth with his sinister laugh amid killing people." Tanhaji earned Khan his second Filmfare Award for Best Supporting Actor. His next release of the year was Jawaani Jaaneman, a comedy-drama about the life of a bachelor (Khan) who discovers that he has a daughter (played by Alaya Furniturewala). The feature was produced under his new company, Black Knight Films, and received generally positive reviews. Kunal Guha of Mumbai Mirror found that the film allowed Khan to "slip into a familiar-yet-age appropriate avatar in a refreshing coming-of-age story."

In 2021, Khan firstly appeared as a politician in Amazon Prime Video's web series Tandav created and directed by Ali Abbas Zafar. He has completed work on Varun V Sharma's crime comedy Bunty Aur Babli 2 opposite Mukerji and Pavan Kripalani's horror comedy Bhoot Police alongside Arjun Kapoor, Yami Gautam and Jacqueline Fernandez and reprise his role as Boris in the sequel of Go Goa Gone, entitled Go Goa Gone 2 with Khemu. In 2022, he collaborated with Hrithik Roshan for the film Vikram Vedha. He received praise for playing an honest cop where Saibal Chatterjee wrote "Saif Ali Khan makes a far better Vikram. He inhabits the character of the tough cop with conviction and exudes the external toughness that defines the man and his mission".

Off-screen work 

Alongside his acting career, Khan has participated in several concert tours and televised award ceremonies. He performed in his first concert tour, "Temptations 2004", with actors Shah Rukh Khan, Rani Mukerji, Preity Zinta, Arjun Rampal and Priyanka Chopra. Showcased in over 22 countries across the world, it became Bollywood's most prominent international concert to that point. In December 2005, Khan performed alongside the band Parikrama at the Mittal Gardens in New Delhi, and later reunited with them and Strings for "The Royal Stag Mega Music Concert" (a four-city concert tour) two years later. The following year, he was part of the "Heat 2006" world tour, along with Akshay Kumar, Preity Zinta, Sushmita Sen and Celina Jaitley. He later performed along with several other Bollywood personalities at the closing ceremony of the 2006 Commonwealth Games.

Since October 2011, Khan has taken the responsibility of managing his father's eye hospital and has also made public appearances to support various other charitable causes. In February 2005, Khan and several other Bollywood actors participated in the 2005 HELP! Telethon Concert to raise money for the victims of the 2004 Indian Ocean earthquake and tsunami. He took part in a charity cricket match organised by IIFA at Headingley Cricket Ground in West Yorkshire, England in 2007, and later hosted an event organised by the award ceremony to help raise funds for various charities in 2011. In November 2008, Khan performed in a concert to raise money for the victims of the 2008 Bihar flood and in September 2013, he attended a charity dinner organised by The Venu Eye institute, donating two of his personal belongings to help raise funds for cataract operations. Later that year, he spent time with underprivileged kids during the filming of Bullett Raja. In October 2014, Khan was appointed as an ambassador for Olympic Gold Quest and donated  to help raise funds for the training of athletes.

In the media 

In an interview with Rajeev Masand, Khan described himself as "a very private person". The journalist Roshmila Bhattacharya added, "Unlike most actors, his interests are not limited to box office collections and workout routines. [He] can converse on anything, from philosophy to politics, from sports to books and music." Filmfare wrote that earlier in his career, Khan gained a reputation for being arrogant, but later matured into "one of showbiz’s biggest and most respected stars." During his career, he has played roles in both high-profile mainstream productions and lesser-publicised films of independent filmmakers, and has appeared in a range of film genres, although he has found a niche playing roles in romantic comedies. The Tribune wrote that his roles in Dil Chahta Hai (2001), Kal Ho Naa Ho (2003), Hum Tum (2004), Salaam Namaste (2005), Love Aaj Kal (2009) and Cocktail (2012) were "essentially endearing pretty boys", and the success of these films established him as the "poster boy for romantic comedies". Beth Watkins explains the typical role Khan played in romantic comedies and its appeal:
"Perhaps related is his finesse for playing petulant, arrogant, almost insufferable young men in need of reform, which, this being Bollywood, they can easily achieve through the love of a good woman. Does his real-life golden status—with literature, cinema, cricket and royalty in his lineage—make him exceptionally effective at coming across as spoiled?"

One of the highest-paid actors in Bollywood, Khan is considered among the most popular and high-profile celebrities in India. He is known to commit heavily to each role and believes in "staying on a sharp learning curve". This commitment, combined with busy schedule and heavy smoking resulted in a health scare in 2007. Analysing his career, the journalist Shomini Sen noted that "[t]he actor was part of some major films in the early 1990s [...] yet critics wrote him of[f] due to lack of a screen presence and poor dialogue delivery." Critics noted that Dil Chahta Hai marked a major turning point for Khan, and credited him for pioneering a movement in actors being part of "a new genre of films which was more urban"; film historian Nasreen Munni Kabir stated that the film helped him find "his own style, combining great comic timing and a natural personality." Sen further explained that "his anglicized upbringing, which initially was a hindrance to his career, became his strongest point." Following his portrayal of a variety of character types in Ek Hasina Thi (2004), Parineeta (2005), Being Cyrus and Omkara (both 2006), Khan was noted for his versatility; India Today attributed his roles in these films to the establishment of a new image for leading actors in Bollywood, and The Tribune published that Khan had successfully "matured, both as an actor of substance and as a bankable star.

Starting in 2007, Khan's relationship with Kareena Kapoor became one of the country's most-reported celebrity stories, and they were listed amongst the top celebrity couple endorsers for brands and products worldwide. In a blog published by The Wall Street Journal, Rupa Subramanya described their marriage as India's "wedding and social event of the year". Kapoor gave birth to their son Taimur in December 2016. From 2012 to 2019, Khan has featured on Forbes Indias "Celebrity 100," a list based on the income and popularity of India's celebrities. In 2003, Khan placed fourth on Rediff's list of "Top Bollywood Male Stars". He was later ranked second in 2005, sixth in 2006 and seventh in 2007. In March 2011, Khan placed fifth on Rediff's list of "Top 10 Actors of 2000–2010". He was ranked among the top 30 on The Times of Indias listing of the "Most Desirable Men" from 2010 to 2015, and has additionally featured in the UK magazine Eastern Eyes "World's Sexiest Asian Men" list in 2008, 2011 and 2012. In 2010 and from 2012 to 2014, Khan was featured as one of the best-dressed male celebrities by the Indian edition of GQ magazine.

Accolades 

Among Khan's film awards are a National Film Award for Best Actor and seven Filmfare Awards out of twelve nominations: Best Male Debut for Aashiq Awara (1993), Best Performance in a Comic Role for Dil Chahta Hai (2001) and Hum Tum (2004), Best Supporting Actor for Kal Ho Naa Ho (2003) and Tanhaji (2020), Best Performance in a Negative Role for Omkara (2006) and the "Moto Look of the Year" for Kal Ho Naa Ho (2003).

See also 
 List of Indian film actors

Footnotes

References

Bibliography

External links 
 
 
 

 
Hindi film producers
1970 births
Living people
Lawrence School, Sanawar alumni
Tagore family
Indian male film actors
Indian male voice actors
People educated at Lockers Park School
People educated at Winchester College
Male actors from Delhi
Filmfare Awards winners
Screen Awards winners
Best Actor National Film Award winners
International Indian Film Academy Awards winners
Zee Cine Awards winners
Male actors in Hindi cinema
Film producers from Mumbai
Recipients of the Padma Shri in arts
20th-century Indian male actors
21st-century Indian male actors
Male actors from Mumbai
Film producers from Delhi
People from New Delhi
Indian male television actors